François Vincent Mathieu Latil (born 2 February 1796 in Aix-en-Provence - deceased on 4 March 1890 in Saint-Girons), was a French painter.

Biography
In 1818 he joined the École des Beaux-Arts. He then went on to study in Paris, with teachers such as Antoine-Jean Gros and Paulin Guérin.

He received a second-class medal from the Salon in 1827 (for Jésus guérit un possédé), and a first-class medal in 1841 (for Episode de l’Histoire des naufrages).

He is perhaps best known for his historical and religious portraits.

External links
 Biography

1796 births
1890 deaths
Artists from Aix-en-Provence
19th-century French painters
French male painters
Pupils of Antoine-Jean Gros
19th-century French male artists
18th-century French male artists